Voiceless is a 2020 Hausa Nigerian thriller film written by Jennifer Agunloye, directed by Robert O. Peters, and produced by Rogers Ofime. The film stars Uzee Usman, Yakubu Mohammed, Asabe Madaki, Sanni Ma'azu, Adam Garba. The film is about a bright and promising girl who was held captive alongside 245 other schoolmates. During her stay at the terrorist camp she crossed path with her soulmate. The film premiered in cinemas on 18 November 2020.

Synopsis

The movie tells the story of Salma and Goni who were kidnapped by a terrorist gang. Goni was kidnapped with his friends to work for the terrorist gang as a skilled mechanic. Salma was kidnapped along with her schoolmates by the gang to satisfy their sexual urge and end the girl's education. Salma and Goni fall in love in the camp, which gave them strength to survive and escape. Goni and his friend Bulus helped the girls escape from the camp, but they came back home to hostility. Salma came back with a baby that her father wasn't happy with. This situation drove Salma away from home.

Cast

 Asabe Madaki
 Uzee Usman
 Yakubu Mohammed
 Abba Ali Zaky
 Sani Mu'azu
 Adam Garba
 Habiba Zock-Sock

Awards and Nominations
The film received fifteen (15) nominations at the Universal Movie Award.

Reception

Aminu Abdulahi Ibrahim said what is fascinating about the movie Voiceless is the way it illustrated how Boko Haram abduct and lure young people into terrorism. It displayed how people take laws into their hands and kill whoever escapes a terrorist gang. He also said, "I do not solicit an amnesty for every escaped and surrendered member but what was exhibited in the movie will surely make people think about their solution. There is amnesty no matter how war is but the government has to be very vigilant to avoid granting remission to the people that will later rearm themselves and murder innocents live."

According to Pulse.ng, "At the heart of Voiceless is a sincere attempt to address all the imaginable vices of insurgency. Sadly, this task understandably becomes too herculean for it to bear. Signing up for Jack's master of all trades class earned it its first and most prominent miss."

See also
List of Nigerian films of 2020

References 

2020 thriller drama films
English-language Nigerian films